Jinhu may refer to:

Mainland China
Jinhu County (金湖县), of Huai'an, Jiangsu
Jinhu, Jianhu County (阜余镇), town in Jianhu County, Jiangsu
Jinhu, Gongqingcheng (金湖镇), town in Gongqingcheng City, Jiangxi

Taiwan
Jinhu, Kinmen, urban township in Kinmen (Quemoy), Fujian